South of Algiers (U.S. The Golden Mask) is a 1953 British travel adventure film, directed by Jack Lee and starring Van Heflin, Wanda Hendrix and Eric Portman.  It is based on an original screenplay by Robert Westerby, and was partly filmed on location in Algeria.

Plot
Doctor Burnet (Portman), a scholar of ancient history at the British Museum, is obsessed with finding the legendary and priceless Golden Mask of Moloch, believed to be buried in the lost tomb of a Roman general somewhere in the Algerian desert.  He plans his latest expedition of discovery, but lacks funds to pay for an archaeologist to accompany him.  He learns from the museum curator that Nicholas Chapman (Heflin), an American author of popular archaeology books, is eager to go along and work without pay, on the understanding that he will be able to publish his experiences in magazine articles and book form.  Burnet is dubious of Chapman's expertise and good-faith, but finally agrees to let him join the party.

Unknown to them, Burnet and Chapman are accompanied on their flight to Algiers by unscrupulous fortune hunter Petris (Charles Goldner) and his sidekick Kress (Jacques B. Brunius), who are just as keen to get their hands on the mask, but in their case purely for financial reasons.

On arrival in Algiers, Burnet meets up with his daughter Anne (Hendrix) and her boyfriend Jacques (Jacques François), whose father is the curator of the local museum of antiquities.  Chapman is attracted to Anne, but she finds his forwardness off-putting. They walk around the ruins of Carthage together. Anne's attitude softens when she sees how kind he is to the local children.

That evening, Chapman goes alone to a nightclub, where Kress homes in on him, plies him with drink and introduces him to a sultry belly dancer.  After a very enjoyable evening, Chapman returns to his hotel room to find his belongings have been ransacked and his maps stolen.

The Burnet party sets out across the Sahara by camel and are beset by dangers including windstorms and attacks by hostile desert nomads.  They finally reach the secret tombs, and narrowly escape with their lives when a roof collapses as they excavate.  Petris and Kress show up and force Chapman to reveal the location of the tomb.  They hatch a plan to kill Burnet and his party to claim the mask for themselves.  However Chapman proves to be more than their match and saves the day.

With Petris and Kress taken care of, the mask is found safely.  Anne realises that she has fallen in love with Chapman, while Jacques magnanimously concedes that they make a good pair.  Burnet admits that he was wrong to doubt Chapman's credentials, and sets about transferring the mask safely to London.

Cast
 Van Heflin as Nicholas Chapman
 Wanda Hendrix as Anne Burnet
 Eric Portman as Doctor Burnet
 Charles Goldner as Petris
 Jacques B. Brunius as Kress
 Jacques François as Jacques Farnod
 Aubrey Mather as Professor Young
 Simone Silva as Zara
 Marne Maitland as Thankyou
 George Pastell as Hassan
 Alec Mango as Mahmoud

Production
Director Jack Lee said the film "was a piece of old hokum, made almost entirely on location. It was quite fun, but it was all cliche stuff, with goodies and baddies and all those spahis riding around chasing bandits."

References

External links 
 
 South of Algiers at BFI Film & TV Database
 

1953 films
1953 adventure films
British black-and-white films
Films shot at Associated British Studios
Films directed by Jack Lee
Films set in Algeria
Films set in London
Films set in Tunisia
Films shot in Algeria
Treasure hunt films
Films set in deserts
British adventure films
1950s English-language films
1950s British films